= Dakins Run =

Stream in Ohio, U.S.

Coordinates: 39°32′02″N 84°04′15″W

Dakins Run is a stream in the U.S. state of Ohio.

Dakins Run was named in honor of a local family.
